Brown stringybark is a common name for several Australian plants and may refer to:
Eucalyptus baxteri, native from New South Wales into Victoria
Eucalyptus capitellata, native to New South Wales